Aplington–Parkersburg High School is a rural public high school in Parkersburg, Iowa, United States. It is a part of the Aplington–Parkersburg Community School District.

History
It was formed in 1992, from the merger of the high schools of the Aplington and Parkersburg school districts. The Parkersburg district maintained the joint high school. The two districts legally merged into a single district on July 1, 2004.

On May 25, 2008, the school was destroyed by an EF5 tornado. It has since been rebuilt.

Athletics
The athletic extracurricular activities at Aplington–Parkersburg High School are football, volleyball, cross country, basketball, wrestling, tennis, soccer, golf, track and field, softball and baseball. The Falcons are classified as a 2A school and compete in North Iowa Cedar League Conference.

Throughout its history, Aplington–Parkersburg has won several state championships in various sports and were state runner-up numerous times. In addition, several graduates have gone on to participate in Division I, Division II, and Division III athletics.

Prior to the 1992 merger, the separate high schools in Aplington and Parkersburg were members of the Big Marsh Conference until the 1976–77 school year, when both schools left to join the Mid Iowa Conference, then the Big Iowa Conference.

Ed Thomas

On June 24, 2009, Ed Thomas, the football coach, track coach, and athletic director, was shot and killed in the weight room. He was featured on the July 6, 2009, cover of Sports Illustrated.

State championships

Notable alumni
Jared DeVries, retired NFL player for the Detroit Lions
Aaron Kampman, retired NFL player who played mainly for the Green Bay Packers
Brad Meester, retired NFL player for the Jacksonville Jaguars
Chelsea Poppens, professional basketball player who formerly played for the San Antonio Stars of the WNBA.
Casey Wiegmann, retired NFL player who played mainly for the Chicago Bears and Kansas City Chiefs

See also
List of high schools in Iowa

References

External links
 Official website
 NPR story on school and shooting

Public high schools in Iowa
Schools in Butler County, Iowa
1993 establishments in Iowa
Educational institutions established in 1993